Bhagwan Shankar Rawat is an Indian politician and was the member of Tenth, Eleventh and Twelfth Lok Sabha. He started his political career in 1961 when he was elected as President of Agra Students Union. In 1968 he was elected as member of Agra Municipal Corporation as BJS candidate and become leader of the party in the house.

References
http://www.elections.in/uttar-pradesh/parliamentary-constituencies/agra.html

http://eci.nic.in/archive/ge1999/pollupd/pc/states/s24/pcnstcand73.htm

1940 births
Living people
India MPs 1991–1996
India MPs 1996–1997
India MPs 1998–1999
People from Agra district
Lok Sabha members from Uttar Pradesh
Politicians from Agra
Bharatiya Janata Party politicians from Uttar Pradesh
Bharatiya Jana Sangh politicians